Elaine Thomson (born 1957 in Inverness) is a former Scottish Labour Party politician.  She was the Member of the Scottish Parliament (MSP) for the Aberdeen North constituency from 1999 to 2003.

In the 2003 election she was defeated by Brian Adam of the Scottish National Party (SNP). After her defeat she returned to work with her previous employer, an Aberdeen-based IT consultancy.

Thomson stood again in Aberdeen North at the 2007 Scottish Parliamentary election but again lost to Brian Adam by an increased majority.

References

External links 
 

1957 births
Living people
People from Inverness
People educated at Harlaw Academy
Labour MSPs
Members of the Scottish Parliament 1999–2003
Members of the Scottish Parliament for Aberdeen constituencies
Female members of the Scottish Parliament
20th-century Scottish women politicians